King Henry VIII Preparatory School (KHPS) is a private school in Coventry, England with 210 pupils (approx) aged from 5 to 11 years old.  It also has a Nursery, Bright Futures Playclub, for an additional 40 children (approx) aged from three to four years old.  Its main building and playing field overlook the War Memorial Park, and its main gates are on The Firs, a street off Kenilworth Road.

The school is part of the Coventry School Foundation, a registered charity which also owns King Henry VIII School, Bablake School and Cheshunt School.

The school was re-formed in September 2008 when Coventry Preparatory School merged with King Henry VIII Junior School  to form the new King Henry VIII Preparatory School.  The two school sites were maintained and the current Coventry Preparatory School site takes pupils from three to eight years old and the King Henry VIII site takes the older children from 8 to 11 years old.

History
Coventry Preparatory School is also known as "The Swallows", after Rev. Kenelm Swallow, who founded the school in 1920.  The main building of the school was previously a large house, built in 1720. It has been owed by the Coventry School Foundation since 1992. In September 2007 the School opted to take pupils up to age 11 years and no longer accepted children aged from age 11 to 13 years.

References

External links
Official website
Coventry School Foundation
Profile on the ISC website
Ofsted report for daycare provision

Private schools in Coventry
Educational institutions established in 1920
1920 establishments in England